The Kahun Gynaecological Papyrus (also Petrie Medical Papyrus, Kahun Medical Papyrus, Lahun Medical Papyrus, or UC32057) is the oldest known medical text in Egyptian history, dated to c. 1825 BCE, during the Twelfth Dynasty.The Papyrus addresses gynecological health concerns, pregnancy, fertility, and various treatments.

History
It was found at El-Lahun (Faiyum, Egypt) by Flinders Petrie in 1889 and first translated by F. Ll. Griffith in 1893 and published in The Petrie Papyri: Hieratic Papyri from Kahun and Gurob. It is kept in the Petrie Museum of Egyptian Archaeology of the University College London. The later Berlin Papyrus and the Ramesseum Papyrus IV cover much of the same ground, often giving identical prescriptions.

The text is divided into thirty-four sections, each section dealing with a specific problem and containing diagnosis and treatment; no prognosis is suggested. Treatments are non-surgical, comprising applying medicines to the affected body part or swallowing them. The womb is seen as the source of complaints manifesting themselves in other body parts, for which its fumigation is recommended, either by oils and incense or whatever the woman smells roasting, should it cause her to smell roasting.

Contraception 

In Column 3, Line 6 of the Papyrus, there are details of a contraception method involving the burning or sprinkling of crocodile dung. The Column 3, Line 6 contraception method is often misconstrued as insertion of crocodile dung against the cervix. The context of Column 3, Line 7 depicts another contraception method involving sprinkling honey and natron salt over the woman's womb to prevent pregnancy.

See also
 List of ancient Egyptian papyri
 Kahun Papyri
 History of medicine

Bibliography

Smith, Lesley. "The Kahun Gynaecological Papyrus: Ancient Egyptian medicine." Journal of Family Planning and Reproductive Health Care (2011): 54-55

References

External links

full text

Ancient Egyptian medical works
Egyptian papyri
Gynaecology